The SWM G01 is a compact crossover SUV that is manufactured by the Chinese manufacturer SWM (automobiles) of Brilliance Shineray. The SWM G01 debuted in April 2018 in Italy, and was launched on the 2018 Beijing Auto Show in China.

Overview

In terms of the chassis, the G01 features front and rear independent suspension. Prices of the G01 ranges from 79,900 yuan to 147,900 yuan.

The model name is an obvious reference to BMW X3 (G01), which, for the Chinese market, is made by SWM's joint venture partner, Brilliance, through another of its joint venture, BMW Brilliance.

A performance variant called the G01 F-Edition was launched in May 2019, featuring a body kit and a completely restyled front end. The G01 F is priced at 95,900 to 125,900 yuan (~US$13,825 - US$18,150)) in Chinese market.

References

External links

G01
Compact sport utility vehicles
Crossover sport utility vehicles
Production electric cars
2010s cars
Cars introduced in 2018
Front-wheel-drive vehicles
Cars of China